May 17—Eastern Orthodox Church calendar—May 19

All fixed commemorations below celebrated on May 31 by Orthodox Churches on the Old Calendar.

For May 18th, Orthodox Churches on the Old Calendar commemorate the Saints listed on May 5.

Saints
 Martyrs Peter of Lampsacus, Andrew, Paul, Dionysia, and Christina, under Decius (c. 249 - 251)
 Martyrs Heraclius, Paulinus, and Benedimus of Athens.
 Martyr Euphrasia of Nicaea (c. 303)
 Martyr Galactia
 Martyr Julian
 Martyr Theodotus of Ancyra, and with him eight virgin-martyrs: 
 Alexandra, Tecusa, Claudia, Phaine (Thaïna), Euphrasia, Theodota, Matrona, and Julia (304)  (see also: June 7)
 Martyr Dioscorus, in Cynopolis of Egypt (305)
 Martyrs Symeon, Isaac, and Bachtisius of Persia (339)
 Hieromartyr Potamon (Palæmon), Bishop of Heraclea in Egypt, and Confessor (340)
 The Holy clergy and lay martyrs massacred under Emperor Valens (364-378)
 Martyrs David and Tarechan, of Georgia (693)
 Patriarch Stephen the New of Constantinople (893)
 Saint Anastaso (Anastasia) of Leukadion (or Laucation), near the Bithinian sea-shore
 Saint Martinian of Areovinthus (Areobindus, Areovinchus), monk of the church of the Theotokos of the Areovinthus quarter, Constantinople
 Hosios Stephanos the Chorabyte

Pre-Schism Western saints
 Martyr Venantius of Camerino (250)
 Hieromartyr Felix, Bishop of Spoleto, in Umbria (304)
 Hieromartyr Pope John I of Rome (526)
 Hieromartyr Pope Theodore I of Rome (649)
 Martyr Merililaun (Merolilaun), a pilgrim murdered near Rheims and venerated as a martyr (8th century)
 Saint Feredarius (Feradach mac Cormaic), Abbot of Iona (c. 880)
 Saint Elgiva, Widow of King Edmund, Abbess of Shaftesbury (944)

Post-Schism Orthodox saints
 Saint Macarius (Glukharev) of the Altai, Archimandrite (1847)
 Saint John Gashkevich, Archpriest of Korma (1917)

New martyrs and confessors
 New Hieromartyr Michael Vinogradov, priest (1932)
 New Hieromartyr Damian (Damjan) Strbac, Jr., priest of Grahovo, Serbia (1941)
 New Hieromartyr Basil Krylov, priest (1942)

Other commemorations
 Translation of the relics of Saint Mildred of Thanet (Mildthryth), Abbess of Minster-in-Thanet (8th century)
 Repose of Blessed Philip, founder of the Gethsemane Caves Skete of St. Sergius Lavra (1869)

Icon gallery

Notes

References

Sources
 May 18/31. Orthodox Calendar (PRAVOSLAVIE.RU).
 May 31 / May 18. HOLY TRINITY RUSSIAN ORTHODOX CHURCH (A parish of the Patriarchate of Moscow).
 May 18. The Roman Martyrology.
 May 18. Latin Saints of the Orthodox Patriarchate of Rome.
 Rev. Richard Stanton. A Menology of England and Wales, or, Brief Memorials of the Ancient British and English Saints Arranged According to the Calendar, Together with the Martyrs of the 16th and 17th Centuries. London: Burns & Oates, 1892. pp. 214–215.
Greek Sources
 Great Synaxaristes:  18 ΜΑΪΟΥ. ΜΕΓΑΣ ΣΥΝΑΞΑΡΙΣΤΗΣ.
  Συναξαριστής. 18 Μαΐου. ECCLESIA.GR. (H ΕΚΚΛΗΣΙΑ ΤΗΣ ΕΛΛΑΔΟΣ). 
Russian Sources
  31 мая (18 мая). Православная Энциклопедия под редакцией Патриарха Московского и всея Руси Кирилла (электронная версия). (Orthodox Encyclopedia - Pravenc.ru).

May in the Eastern Orthodox calendar